The New York Big Band Concert is a live performance DVD with Harry Connick Jr. and his big band.

Track listing 

 Sweet Georgia Brown (Kenneth Casey, Maceo Pinkard, Ben Bernie) – 3:29
 Don't Get Around Much Anymore (Duke Ellington, Bob Russell) – 5:12
 Recipe For Love (Harry Connick Jr.) – 2:27
 Bare Necessities (Terry Gilkyson) – 3:15
 They Can't Take That Away from Me (George Gershwin, Ira Gershwin) – 6:11
 You Didn't Know Me When (Connick, Ramsey McLean) – 3:10
 He Is They Are (Connick) – 4:04
 With Imagination (Connick, McLean) – 8:07
 We Are In Love (Connick) – 2:30
 It Had To Be You (Isham Jones, Gus Kahn) – 2:10
 Just Kiss Me (Connick) – 5:20
 All Of Me (Gerald Marks, Seymour Simons) – 8:25
 Paramount Fanfare

Award 
 1993 Emmy Award winner – Outstanding Individual Achievement in Sound Mixing for a Variety or Music Series or a Special
 Gregg Rubin (pre-production mixer/re-recording mixer)
 Randy Ezratty (production mixer)
 John Alberts (master)

See also 
 Blue Light, Red Light

Certifications 
 RIAA certification: Video longform – Gold (June 24, 2002)

References

External links 
 

Harry Connick Jr. video albums
1993 live albums
1993 video albums
Live video albums